Venter is an unincorporated community in King William County, Virginia, United States. The area includes Venter Heights, a prominent neighborhood in the area.

References

Unincorporated communities in Virginia
Unincorporated communities in King William County, Virginia